Kallara is a village and a Grama Panchayat  in Thiruvananthapuram district in the state of Kerala, India. It is located near Karette, a junction in the MC road.

Kallara is about 40 km away from Thiruvananthapuram city, 7 km distance from State High Way road and 20 km far from National High Way 47.

″The Kallara-Pangode Freedom Struggle″ is one of the 39 agitations declared by the Government of India as the movements that led to the country gaining independence from the British rule.[1][2][3][4] It is listed alongside some of the most important movements of Indian independence such as Quit India Movement, Khilafat Movement, Malabar Rebellion, the Ghaddar Movement and Hollwell Revolt Movement by Netaji Subhash Chandra Bose. It is ranked 26th among the 39 most revered movements that were part of Indian Independence Movement and culminated in the British rule ending over Indian territories in 1947.[5] 

Kallara Vocational Higher Secondary School located in kallara town (100 years). One of the Famous Temple "Kallara Ayiravilly Kshethram".kizhakkathil veedu is one of the famous family in vazhathoppu pacha .  From kallara towards Cheruvalam road (2 km from kallara. ''Kollam vilakathu veedu'' is one of the famous Oldest and biggest family in 'pankadu' from kallara towards kallara pazhavila road(4km )from kallara town.  And also the oldest temples ( 1 Thumpodu mahadeva temple ,Elankam Parandottappan temple ,Pankadu Ayirivallikkavu sree Badrakali temple).Located in kallara grama panchayathu.  Pattara located one of the famous Anjaneya swami Temple, Pattara valavil kottayil shree anjaneyaswami temple.  From, Kallara -Tholikkuzhy road, one can reach the famous "Mahadevarpacha Siva kshetram" Temple about 1 km from Kallara.  Famous "Thachonam Sree Devi Kshethram" is around 2 km from Kallara town. (2.5 km from kallara) vazhathoppupacha located famous club "JWALA".Grameena grandasala and Islamic reading room situated in pattara also ti be mentioned. 
Kallara is a secular panchayath, here peoples of all religion hold their hands together for over all development. Now kallara panchayath is ruled by LDF. The president of kallara panchayath is Mr.Santha kumar.
The famous temple Thumpodu mudippura devi temple is situated in Thumpodu ward of kallara panchayath. The Annadhanam and Ponkala associated with Thumpodu mudippura fest calls attention of many people.
Raktha sakshi mandapam, in memory of those who shed blood in kallara pangodu revolution is situated in the town.
Juma masjid of kallara is also situated in the town, thousands of devotees used to come and pray here.

Kallara is famous for the south indian top movie stars, sisters AMBIKA and RADHA and their mother KALLARA SARASAMMA close aid of K karunakaran for 40 years.

Kallara in Trivandrum district is mostly derived by famous "Nair" Community, who were close aid at the kingdom of Kilimanoor palace. 2 centuries ago it was thick forest and rough regions and Nair’s conquered these forests with the approval of the king from the Kilimanoor Palace. Though it is Nair dominated community, Kallara is having a great mixture of all caste and religions, especially highly positioned Islam community. Communities of kallara lives with harmony among all walk of people, caste and religion and Kallara town serves a vital junction for many businesses connecting to several local areas, such as Pangodu, kilimanoor, palode, which extend to the Tamil Nadu Border to Schencotah and Coutralam through a marvelous picturestic hilly route, within 40 km. Politics have mixed results in election with communist in one side and congress in other hand. And they equally get a term in most of legislative or parliamentary elections. Pangodu police station and kilimanoor police station serves the areas of Kallara, and crimes are relatively less due to the clos knit community living. Most of the inner roads have government and private bus connectivity and Kallara junction hold one of the highest number of public taxi vehicles comprising cars, Suv’s, Muv,s  and autos etc. Kallara do not have any historical incidents to be placed because it’s a hilly station and notable population was only between last 30-40 years.
There were rumors that few Naxal crimes were taken place in the year of end of 70s and beginning of 80s, but was only for small period of time, were all naxal movements where suppressed by the congress government periodically. This beautiful village is covered with 100% greens and tens of other small villages with beautiful hindu temples and Islamic masjids.                 J

Demographics
 India census, Kallara had a population of 25,779 with 12,080 males and 13,699 females.

Politics
Assembly constituency: Vamanapuram 
Lok Sabha constituency: Attingal.

References

Villages in Thiruvananthapuram district